Allen Parish School Board is a school district headquartered in Oberlin in Allen Parish in southwestern Louisiana, United States.

From 1960 to 1969, Dorothy Sue Hill, the state representative for Allen, Beauregard, and Calcasieu parishes, taught home economics for Allen Parish schools.

Schools

PK-12 schools
 Elizabeth High School  (Elizabeth)
 Fairview High School  (Grant, Unincorporated area)
 Reeves High School  (Reeves)

7-12 schools
 Oberlin High School  (Oberlin)

High schools

 Kinder High School  (Unincorporated area)
 Oakdale High School  (Oakdale)

Middle schools

4-8 
 Oakdale Middle School (Oakdale)

6-8 
 Kinder Middle School (Kinder)

Elementary schools

PK-6 
 Oberlin Elementary School (Oberlin)

PK-5 
 Kinder Elementary School (Kinder)

PK-4 
 Oakdale Elementary School (Oakdale)

References

External links
 Allen Parish School Board

Education in Allen Parish, Louisiana
School districts in Louisiana
School districts in the Central Louisiana